Wanting Qu (born October 10, 1984), known simply as Wanting, is a Chinese-born singer-songwriter and pianist who is currently based in Vancouver, British Columbia, Canada.

Career
Wanting Qu was born and raised in Harbin, Heilongjiang, China, where her mother  worked as a city official. She moved to Canada at 16 to study, eventually earning a degree in international business, and relocated to Vancouver where she began her musical career.

In 2009, she became the first Chinese artist to be signed to the Nettwerk label; she is managed by Terry McBride. Her first album, Everything in the World (produced by Winston Hauschild and jointly released with Universal Music China in 2012) went platinum in China within its first week on sale, and her singles "You Exist in My Song" and "Drenched" were used in the soundtrack for the Hong Kong film Love in the Buff.

In 2013, she became the first ever tourism ambassador for Vancouver, with the intention of raising Canada's profile among destinations for Chinese visitors.

Qu appeared on the 2013 CCTV New Year's Gala, where she performed "You Exist in My Song".

The song "Star in You" from the album Everything in the World was featured in Degrassi: The Next Generation in the episode "Bitter Sweet Symphony, Part II" on February 22, 2013.

On October 26, 2015, while making the third album; Qu released her new English single "Love Birds" on her YouTube channel.

Personal life
It was reported in January 2015 that Qu and Vancouver mayor Gregor Robertson were dating, and they publicly confirmed that they were in a relationship in February 2015. The relationship drew criticism from some as Robertson was still married to Amy Robertson (although the two had separated). Qu and Robertson broke up in May 2017.

On April 24, 2015, Qu's mother Zhang Mingjie was arrested in China due to allegations of corruption, embezzlement (of roughly $350 million CNY or $55 million USD) and abuse of power, claiming that she had participated in the "sale of state properties below market value for personal profit". Qu's mother had previously been relieved from her duties related to the city's urban construction and renewal activities in the fall of 2014. Roughly 566 workers families was ruined by her, many has died under the cold of -25.6 F, but more had committed suicided because they has lost their only source of income and their subsidy got embezzled. Before her mother got arrested, she had transferred all her money to Qu. Qu did not publicly comment on the matter, but uploaded an "enigmatic" photo to her Weibo account urging "patience". She later posted a message on Instagram saying "I want nothing but love, health and happiness for her. She's my mother. I'm her only child. No one can replace her in my heart. Despite our differences, we share the same blood." Both Qu's record label and Mayor Robertson's office declined to comment, with Robertson's director of communications saying "That's not something that this office would be commenting on". In 2016, it is reported that Qu's mother is facing the death penalty in China.

On March 9, 2018, Qu gave an update on her mother's case, saying that she believed Chinese law was "perfect and righteous" and that she had faith there would be a positive outcome. She added that no judgment had been issued since the trial's end in 2016. Qu's comments regarding her mother being "her hero" have caused controversy in China, with some accusing Qu of overlooking the seriousness of the case and refusing to believe her mother could be guilty. On 18 November 2021, Qu's mother Zhang Mingjie was sentenced to life imprisonment after the courts of China found her guilty of bribery and abuse of power.

Discography

Albums
 Everything In The World (2012.4.24)
 Say The Words (2013.10.18)
 LLL (2017.10.27)

Extended plays
 Love I Am (2009.4.25)
 Drenched (2012.4.24)

Singles
 "如何是好" (2011)
 "Life Is Like A Song" (2012.3.13)
 "Drenched" (2012.4.24)
 "You Exist In My Song" (我的歌声里, 2012.4.24)
 "Love Ocean" (爱的海洋,2013.9.11)
 "We Under The Sunshine" (阳光下的我们,2013.9.29)
 "When It's Lonely" (我为你歌唱,2013.10.9)
 "The Courage To Love" (爱的勇气,2014.7.24)
 "Love Birds" (2015.10.2)
 "Best Plan" (最好的安排,2016.7.18)
 "Your Girl" (2016.7.22)
 "On The Edge" (2016.11.28)
 "Moon and Back (JordanXL Remix)" (2017.3.10)
 "Kissing Paradise" (2017.6.23)
 You Can't Hurt Me Anymore (2018)

Other appearances
 生命有一種絕對 (There's One Type of Certainty in Life) from the compilation album Her Story With Mayday (2015.6.26)

Filmography

Awards

Global Chinese music awards

Qu has won three Global Chinese Music Awards.

|-
| rowspan="3"|2012 || rowspan="2"|Wanting Qu || Best Newcomer || 
|-
| Outstanding Regional Artist Award (Beijing) || 
|-
| "You Exist in My Song" || Best Song || 
|}

Chinese music awards

Qu has won four Chinese Music Awards.

|-
| rowspan="4"|2012 || rowspan="3"|Wanting Qu || Best New Artist || 
|-
| Best New Original Artist || 
|-
| Best Music Composer || 
|-
| "You Exist in My Song" || Best Song || 
|}

Music Times Awards

Qu has won one Music Times Award.

|-
| 2012 || Everything in the World || Best Album of the Year || 
|}

References

External links
 Personal Official Website
 Official biography at Nettwerk
 Biography at AllMusic
  at TikTok

Living people
1984 births
Chinese singer-songwriters
Chinese women pianists
Musicians from Harbin
Chinese expatriates in Canada
21st-century Chinese women singers
21st-century pianists
Nettwerk Music Group artists
21st-century women pianists
Seneca College alumni